Tiaki Omana (18 December 1891 – 24 June 1970), also known by the English name Jack Ormond, was a New Zealand rugby union player and politician. He won the Rātana Movement's fourth Maori electorate of Eastern Maori in 1943 from Āpirana Ngata who had held it since 1905.

Biography

Early life
He was born John (Jack) Ormond on 18 December 1891 at Mahia, but became commonly known as Tiaki Omana. He was the fourth child of George Canning Ormond, a sheepfarmer, and his wife Maraea Kiwiwharekete who was of Ngāti Kahungunu. He was of aristocratic Ngāti Rongomaiwahine descent and was also a grandson of John Davies Ormond, first Superintendent of Hawke's Bay.

A keen rugby player, even after joining the New Zealand (Māori) Pioneer Battalion and fighting in France during World War I, he was still able to play on the wing for the Pioneer Battalion team. Omana played Ranfurly Shield matches for his province, Hawke's Bay, and once for the All Blacks in 1923 against a touring team from New South Wales.

Omana was a sheepfarmer on the isolated Māhia Peninsula before becoming a Member of Parliament.

Member of Parliament

As a Rātana/Labour member, he raised the issue of land claims, housing and health for Māori, and discrimination in social security. Omana held the electorate until his retirement in 1963, when he returned to farming and to his original Church of England faith.

Former press gallery reporter Leslie Hobbs wrote that "Jack Omana, was one of the most popular and respected members of the House, but he never worked up any enthusiasm for party politics, particularly the fighting side of it. He liked everyone too much and everyone liked him." He was noted as frequently bringing boxes of kumara grown his farm in Mahia back to Wellington as presents for his friend, but political adversary, Keith Holyoake (a fellow farmer).

Death
Omana died on 24 June 1970 at Napier and was buried at Mokotahi, Mahia Beach.

Personal life
Omana married Nellie Airini Elizabeth Perry at the Cathedral Church of St John the Evangelist in Napier on 23 February 1921. The couple had twin children, a girl and a boy. They soon divorced on 29 November 1922. He later remarried to Polly Gemmell on 6 February 1926 at Wairoa. They had one child, a daughter who died in infancy. Polly herself died in 1949. Omana married a third time to Rangiwhakio Rarere (née Kemara), a widow, at Wairoa on 15 March 1962. She died soon after in November that same year.

Ratana name
Tiaki Omana was also referred to as Hamuera after Tahupōtiki Wiremu Rātana's son Hamuera Ratana, symbol of the end of tohunga witchcraft.

Notes

References

 Henderson, James Mcleod (1963). Ratana The Man, The Church, The Movement (1st ed.) A.H & A.W. Reed Ltd .

External links

 

1891 births
1970 deaths
Ngāti Kahungunu people
New Zealand international rugby union players
New Zealand Army personnel
New Zealand farmers
New Zealand rugby union players
New Zealand Labour Party MPs
New Zealand people of World War I
People educated at Christ's College, Christchurch
People from Māhia Peninsula
Rātana MPs
New Zealand Rātanas
New Zealand MPs for Māori electorates
New Zealand sportsperson-politicians
Members of the New Zealand House of Representatives
Hawke's Bay rugby union players
Unsuccessful candidates in the 1935 New Zealand general election
Rugby union players from the Hawke's Bay Region
Tiaki